"Shikwa" ("Complaint") (Video Link) and "Jawab-e-Shikwa" ("Response to the Complaint") (Video Link) are poems written by Muhammad Iqbal, in the Urdu language, which were later published in his book Bang e Dara" The poems are often noted for their musicality, poetical beauty and depth of thought.

Overview
Though much of his poetry is written in Persian, Muhammad Iqbal was also a poet of stature in Urdu. Shikwa, published in 1909, and Jawab-e-Shikwa, published in 1913, extol the legacy of Islam and its civilizing role in history, bemoan the fate of Muslims everywhere, and squarely confront the dilemmas of Islam in modern times. Shikwa is in the form of a complaint to Allah for having let down Muslims and Jawab-e-Shikwa is in the form of God's reply.

The central idea of the poem Shikwa is that God is not fulfilling his promise to protect followers of the Prophet from loss and a decline in fortune. In Jawab-e Shikwa God answers directly that he has not broken his promise; instead it is the Muslims, his followers, who have turned away from the Path.

Controversies On Shikwa
The reason why Shikwa raised controversies is that the main theme of the poem was the 'Complaint to God' for Muslim's downfall, ill-treatment and troubles they were facing. When the first of these poems, Shikwa, was published it created confusion among Muslim Scholars who thought that Iqbal was being ungrateful for the blessings of God. "When Iqbal wrote Shikwa, orthodox religious clerics called him an infidel, and in all honesty, Shikwa does emanate a very strong sense of entitlement". The second poem, Jawab-e-Shikwa, was not announced with the publication of the first, but when it was published four years later Iqbal was praised for his contribution to Urdu poetry and Islamic literature.

Publication
Iqbal recited Shikwa for the first time in April 1909, at a poetry gathering organized by Anjuman-i-Himayat-i-Islam in Lahore. In 1913 Iqbal recited its sequel Javab-e-Shikwa at a political rally held outside Mochi Gate, Lahore to raise money for the Turkish struggle against a Bulgarian uprising, a prefiguring of the Khilafat Movement.

Composition

Iqbal composed both the poems in the Arabic metre ramal. Shikwa is made of 31 stanzas of six lines each, while Javab-e-Shikwa is made of 36 stanzas of the same length. The first four hemistichs (misra) have the same rhyme and the last two a different one; i.e. the rhyme scheme is AAAABB. In the whole work four verses are in Persian.

In this metre, the next-to-last long syllable can be replaced at will by two short syllables; i.e., in the first verse of Shikwa, Iqbal replaced next-to-last long syllables by two short syllables:

Translations
The available translations of both poems are:
 The Complaint And The Answer (1943) by Altaf Husain
 Complaint And Answer (1955) by A. J. Arberry
 Shikwa And Jawab-e-Shikwa by Nawab Mahmood Ali Khan Tyro
 Complaint And Answer (1981) by Khushwant Singh
 Allama Muhammad Iqbal's Expostulation With The Almighty And Almighty's Censure (1977) by Suleman Zubair
 Representation And Reply (1998) by Raja Sultan Zahur Akhtar
 Shikwa & Jawab Shikwa: The Complaint and the Answer: The Human Grievance and the Divine Response'' (2015) by Abdussalam Puthige

Legacy
Both poems were sung by the Sabri Brothers, Nusrat Fateh Ali Khan and the late Aziz Mian.

Both poems were recited together in Coke Studio Season 11. Shikwa was sung  by  Natasha Baig, while Fareed Ayaz, Abu Muhammad Qawwal & Brothers sang Jawab-e-Shikwa .

See also 
 Index of Muhammad Iqbal–related articles
 Urdu poetry

References

External links

 
 Allama Iqbal Shikwa translation in English
 Allama Iqbal jawab e Shikwa translation in English
 Allama Iqbal Shikwa (شکوہ) "The Complaint" Video With English Subtitle On InfoBouy (Youtube Channel)
 Allama Iqbal Jawab-e-Shikwa (جواب شکوہ) "Response to the Complaint" Video With English Subtitle On InfoBouy (Youtube Channel)

Islamic poetry
Poetry about spirituality
Poetry by Muhammad Iqbal